Musa Sukwene is a South African singer, originally hailing from Witbank Mpumalanga province who won the ninth season of Idols South Africa in 2013. On 3 December it was revealed that Sukwene had been signed to be represented by About Entertainment.

Career 
In 2016, his second studio album Mr. Serious  was released and later was certified triple platinum  with sales of 90 000 copies.

He was diagnosed with dyslexia.

Discography

Studio albums 
 Dream (2014)
 Mr. Serious (2016)
 Musa (2018)
 ''Backroom (2022)

References

Idols South Africa winners
Living people
21st-century South African male singers
1986 births

Musicians with dyslexia